The New Bell (Spanish: La campana nueva) is a 1950 Argentine comedy drama film directed by Luis Moglia Barth and starring Pedro Quartucci, Rosa Rosen and Florindo Ferrario.

The film's sets were designed by the art director Mario Vanarelli.

Cast
 Ana Arneodo 
 Julio Bousquet
 Mario Cossa 
 Florindo Ferrario 
 Adolfo Linvel 
 Juan Porta 
 Pedro Quartucci 
 Rosa Rosen 
 Orestes Soriani

Technical specifications

References

Bibliography 
 Plazaola, Luis Trelles.  South American Cinema: Dictionary of Film Makers. La Editorial, UPR, 1989.

External links 
 

1950 films
1950 comedy-drama films
Argentine comedy-drama films
1950s Spanish-language films
Films directed by Luis Moglia Barth
Argentine black-and-white films
1950s Argentine films